Beech Factory Airport  is a public use airport located five nautical miles (9 km) east of the central business district of Wichita, a city in Sedgwick County, Kansas, United States. It is privately owned by Beechcraft.

Facilities and aircraft 
It has one runway designated 1/19 with a concrete surface measuring 8,000 by 100 feet (2,438 x 30 m).

For the 12-month period ending May 13, 2008, the airport had 32,700 aircraft operations, an average of 89 per day: 86% general aviation and 14% military. At that time there were 77 aircraft based at this airport: 27% single-engine, 38% multi-engine, 13% jet and 22% military. Following the merger of the Cessna and Beechcraft employee flying clubs, Cessna's flying club has since moved from their previous base at Wichita Mid-Continental Airport to Beech Factory Airport.

History 
The airport was founded in 1928 as part of a 148-acre land tract purchased from the city to house the Knoll Aircraft Company. The Yellow Air Cab Company purchased the assets in 1930, followed by Beechcraft in 1940.

Nearby airports

Other airports in Wichita
 Wichita Dwight D. Eisenhower National Airport
 Colonel James Jabara Airport
 Cessna Aircraft Field
 McConnell Air Force Base
 Westport Airport

Other airports in metro
 El Dorado / Captain Jack Thomas Airport
 Augusta Municipal Airport
 Lloyd Stearman Field (Benton)
Other airports in region
 List of airports in Kansas
 List of airports in Oklahoma

Incidents 
On November 20, 2013 at approximately 9:30 pm CST, a Boeing 747-400 Dreamlifter with registration N780BA and operated by Atlas Air was en route to McConnell Air Force Base when it landed at the wrong airport. The pilots initially erroneously thought that they were at Beech Factory Airport. After reviewing coordinates with ATC and communicating with local ground control, it was determined that they were in fact at Colonel James Jabara Airport.  The plane successfully took off at 1:15 pm CST on November 21 and landed at nearby McConnell AFB.  The NTSB opened an investigation about the wrong landing.

References

External links 
 Beech Factory Airport at Kansas DOT Airport Directory
 
 

Airports in Kansas
Beechcraft
Buildings and structures in Sedgwick County, Kansas
Transportation in Wichita, Kansas
Transportation in Sedgwick County, Kansas